Detective Inspector William "Will" Davies is a fictional character from the British Channel 4 soap opera Hollyoaks. He was played by Barny Clevely between 2000 and 2004, with a brief return from 8 to 11 April 2005.

Character history
Will was quite laid back but responsible and supportive to his children Ben and Abby. Will began early on dating Sue Morgan and the relationship seemed to be going reasonably well until Sue decided to return to her husband Andy. Will was devastated as he was deeply in love with her, and on several occasions he tried to persuaded Sue away from Andy, but it did not change her mind. With the help of Ben, Will decided to move on. In Hollyoaks, murders began happening with the targets being young blonde girls and Will was under pressure by the residents of the village after he failed to discover any further leads. In came DCI Dale Jackson, who took over the case and Will got major designs on his colleague, when he asked her to move in with the Davies. Abby was certainly pleased and hoped that Will could find happiness with Dale, but Ben disliked the idea.

One night, Will was left shocked and devastated when he caught Dale and Ben in bed together. An ashamed Ben tried to apologise; however, Will insisted that it really never bothered him and made it clear to Ben that he was free to do anything he wanted. However, another twist emerged when Dale told Will she had feelings for him and the pair began to date, despite Ben’s warnings. Ben was furious at his father's actions and accused Dale of using him, leading Will to throw Ben out of his own house. Eventually, Will and Ben made up, but Will was to face another shock when Dale left after being sacked by the commissioner. Another setback then followed for Will when Ben got Will's assistant officer, Emma chambers, pregnant. What Ben was unaware of was that Emma had had an affair with Will several years ago when he was married to Ben's mum, which had caused the splitting of his parents. Ben was angry with Will for not telling him, but both father and son made their amends. Will supported his son Ben through his failed marriage with Izzy Cornwell and also supported his daughter Abby through her troubles. Will went on to receive a job offer in London and moved away from Hollyoaks.

In April 2005, Will returned for a visit when Ben's friend Lisa Hunter told him Ben had re-injured his broken leg and had been put back in hospital. During his brief stay, Steph Dean tried to fix him up with her mother, Frankie Osborne. Will thought they were only going to have a friendly dinner with her and her husband Johnno, as he had no idea that Johnno had left her. After dinner, Will said he wouldn't be back in town for some time, and as Frankie apologised, Steph and Craig threw him out under their misguided notion he was abandoning their family just as their father had. The next day, Ben was released from hospital, and told his father to return to London so he wouldn't lose any pay.

See also
List of past characters from Hollyoaks

Hollyoaks characters
Television characters introduced in 2000
Male characters in television
Fictional British police detectives